Transmembrane protein 150A is a protein that, in humans, is encoded by the TMEM150A gene.

References

Further reading